Fermo is a city in Italy.

Fermo may also refer to:
 Province of Fermo, a province in Italy
 March of Fermo, a frontier territory of the Holy Roman Empire
 John of Fermo an Italian Franciscan friar